Al-Hadidi, Hadidi, or Hadidiyin is an Arab tribe.
This tribe is primarily located in As-Salt, Jordan, the country's first capital. Members of the tribe can also be found in Egypt, northern Iraq (mostly in Kirkuk and Mosul), and Syria. The Current head of this tribe is Mohammed Al-Orchani.

Influence

Most members of Al-Hadidi tribe are highly educated and have had a great influence on the cultural and social movement in their city and society. The tribe is of Muslim origins and are descendant of the prophet Mohammad. The family has a great number of scholars, including published PhD holders, design (UIUX) and particularly physicians who practice medicine.

Arab groups